Jump for Glory is a 1937 British romantic drama film directed by Raoul Walsh and starring Douglas Fairbanks Jr., Valerie Hobson and Alan Hale. It was based on a novel by Gordon McDonnell. The film was shot at Isleworth Studios by the independent company Criterion Film for distribution by United Artists. The film's sets were designed by the art director Edward Carrick.

Synopsis
Rick Morgan, an American involved in the bootlegging trade, is forced to relocate to Britain where he becomes one of the top cat burglars in London. One night while breaking into a house he runs into the daughter of its occupant Glory Fane and they soon fall in love. However, one of Morgan's old associates from the United States, now masquerading as a respectable member of British society, threatens to wreck his chances of going straight and finding happiness with Glory.

Cast
Per opening credits and British Film Catalogue
 Douglas Fairbanks Jr. as Ricky Morgan
 Valerie Hobson as Glory Howard later Glory Fane
 Alan Hale as Jim Dial (alias Colonel Fane)
 Edward Rigby as Sander
 Barbara Everest as Mrs. Nolan
 Jack Melford as Thompson
 Anthony Ireland as Sir Timothy Haddon
 Esme Percy as Robinson
 Basil Radford as Valentine
 Leo Genn as Peters
 Ian Fleming as Coroner
 Frank Birch as Vicar
 Roland Culver as Conductor
 Fred Duprez
 Henry Longhurst
 Win Oughton
 Cecil Bevan as Butler
 Joan Connor
 Mary Kerridge
 Jim Burnett
 Hindle Edgar
 Herbert Cameron
 Dorothy Oldfield
 George Mozart

References

Bibliography
 Low, Rachael. History of the British Film: Filmmaking in 1930s Britain. George Allen & Unwin, 1985.

External links
 

1937 films
1937 romantic drama films
1937 crime drama films
British black-and-white films
British romantic drama films
British crime drama films
British heist films
Films directed by Raoul Walsh
Films based on British novels
Films set in England
Films set in London
Films shot at Isleworth Studios
United Artists films
Films scored by Percival Mackey
1930s English-language films
1930s British films